Jay Mack Love Jr. (May 15, 1883 – September 16, 1935) was a college football player and coach who later became a practicing attorney in Arkansas City, Kansas.

Playing career
Love played for the University of Michigan from 1904 until 1905 under head coach Fielding H. Yost.  He was a reserve player for the undefeated team of 1904 and started at right guard for the 1905 team.

Coaching career
After finishing his playing career at Michigan, Love was named the third head football coach for the Southwestern College Moundbuilders in Winfield, Kansas and held that position two years, from 1906 to 1907.  His overall coaching record at Southwestern was 8 wins, 6 losses, and 2 ties.

Head coaching record

References

External links
 

1883 births
1935 deaths
American football guards
Michigan Wolverines football players
Southwestern Moundbuilders football coaches